BellaNaija is a lifestyle, entertainment and fashion website in Africa. headquartered in Lagos, Nigeria.

History
BellaNaija was founded by Uche Eze in 2006 as a media startup which later metamorphosed into  BellaNaija.com while studying for her undergraduate degree at the Ivey School of Business, University of Western Ontario, Canada. BellaNaija in its early form featured scanned magazine articles, pictures and interviews of Nigerian fashion personalities.

Achievements 
In 2013, BellaNaija was ranked 4th in AfricaRanking's "Top 10 African Entertainment Websites". Uche Pedro & BellaNaija was mentioned in the SME 100 List of 100 most innovative female-owned businesses in Nigeria, completed Stanford Seed programme and BBNWonderland - BN Lead Weddings Flagship Event with Baileys

Awards

References

External links
 

Nigerian news websites
Lifestyle websites
Magazines established in 2006
2006 establishments in Nigeria
Online magazines
Magazines published in Lagos
Online magazines published in Nigeria